Gene Jones may refer to:
Gene Jones (golfer) (born 1957), American golfer
Gene Jones (actor), American actor
Gene Jones (born 1936), American football player for one game with the Houston Oilers

See also
Eugene Jones (disambiguation)
Jean Jones (disambiguation)